The Federal Correctional Institution, Tucson (FCI Tucson) is a medium-security United States federal prison for male inmates with an administrative facility for male and female offenders. It is part of the Tucson Federal Correctional Complex (FCC Tucson) and operated by the Federal Bureau of Prisons, a division of the United States Department of Justice.

History
Opened in March 1982, the institution was originally a metropolitan correctional center designed for a capacity of 392 inmates. The staff numbered 237 as of 2002.

Facility
The facility houses approximately 770 inmates. Males are held in two-person medium security cells, and there is an administrative facility for both male and female offenders. The prison mainly holds pretrial inmates from federal court proceedings in the District of Arizona as well as short term and sentenced inmates awaiting transfer.

Notable inmates (current and former)
†Inmates released prior to 1982 are not listed on the Bureau of Prisons website.

See also

 List of U.S. federal prisons
 Federal Bureau of Prisons
 Incarceration in the United States

References

External links
 FCI Tucson at the Federal Bureau of Prisons (Official site)

Buildings and structures in Tucson, Arizona
Tucson
Tucson
1982 establishments in Arizona